The Embalmer (also known as The Taxidermist) is a 2002 Italian noir-drama film directed by Matteo Garrone. The film was selected for the Quinzaine des Realisateurs in the 2002 Cannes Film Festival as L'etrange monsieur Peppino.  The plot is based on real events. For his performance in the film Ernesto Mahieux won the David di Donatello for Best Supporting Actor. The film was also awarded with a David di Donatello for Best Script  and two Nastro d'Argento awards for best editing and best producer.

Cast 
 Valerio Foglia Manzillo as Valerio
Ernesto Mahieux as  Peppino
 Elisabetta Rocchetti as  Deborah
 Lina Bernardi as Deborah's mother 
 Pietro Biondi as Deborah's father
 Aldo Leonardi as Deborah's boss

See also 
List of Italian films of 2002

References

External links

2002 films
Italian drama films
Films directed by Matteo Garrone
2000s Italian-language films
2000s Italian films
Fandango (Italian company) films